A licence to kill is a licence granted by a government or government agency to a particular operative or employee to initiate the use of lethal force in the delivery of their objectives. The initiation of lethal force is in contrast to the use of lethal force in self-defence or the protection of life. It is well known as a literary device used in espionage fiction.

Overview
The legitimacy of deadly force usage from country to country is generally controlled by statute, particular and direct executive orders, the common law, or rules of engagement.

Sir Richard Dearlove, former head of the UK Secret Intelligence Service MI6, testified in court as part of the 2007–2008 Diana, Princess of Wales Inquest in agreement with a statement that the SIS (MI6) could only use force "likely to cause injury" if specially authorized to do so by the UK Foreign Secretary.

Dearlove also testified in the same inquest that he was unaware of anyone ever having been assassinated by MI6 during his time as head from 1999 to 2004.

Former MI6 agent Matthew Dunn stated that MI6 agents do not need a licence to kill as a spy's primary job is to violate the law in other countries, and if an agent is compromised, they are at the mercy of the authorities of that country.

The idea of a licence to kill is popularly known from the James Bond novels and films, where it is signified by the "00" (Double O) designation given to the agents in the series who are licensed to kill; Bond himself is famously agent 007.

In literary portrayals, the licence is presumed to be a discretionary one, distributed rarely and requiring extensive training to obtain, granted only to a handful of covert agents of a state in the interest of national security. The agent is not necessarily expected to kill enemies as part of a mission, but may receive legal immunity from prosecution (in their own country) if in the agent's opinion, it became necessary to complete it.

See also
 Executive Order 12333
 Euthanasia

References

Secret Intelligence Service
James Bond
Homicide
Assassinations